A Timeless Place is an album by the musician Jeri Brown, released in 1995.

The album was nominated for a Juno Award, in the "Best Mainstream Jazz Album" category.

Production
The album was produced by Jim West. Brown was accompanied by Jimmy Rowles on piano and Eric Von Essen on bass; Rowles also sang on "Baby, Don't Quit Now". The album was recorded in Hollywood in May 1994. A classically trained vocalist, Brown decided to sing in a more natural style on A Timeless Place. "Morning Star" was cowritten by Rowles and Johnny Mercer.

Critical reception

Tucson Weekly wrote that "the lyrics are clever, the melodies oddly shaped, the changes sophisticated, and the ambiance more than suggests that stereotypical late night jazz/lounge hang." The Toronto Star stated that "Brown opts for the craft and laid-back intimacy of phrasing exemplified by Cleo Laine and Billie Holiday."

The Calgary Herald determined that "Brown sounds more like a cabaret performer than a jazz vocalist with her straight-arrow ballad renditions, while Rowles furnishes nothing more than barely-adequate accompaniments." The Omaha World-Herald panned the "overdramatic Lena Horne route."

AllMusic wrote that "Brown gives great emphasis and feeling to the often sensuous (and occasionally witty) lyrics."

Track listing

References

1995 albums
Justin Time Records albums